Örebro County or Region Örebro held a regional council election on 9 September 2018, on the same day as the general and municipal elections.

Results
The number of seats remained at 71 with the Social Democrats winning the most at 25, a drop of four from in 2014. The party declined from 40.7% to 34.5% of the popular vote.

Municipalities

Images

References

Elections in Örebro County
Örebro